Scythris corleyi is a moth of the family Scythrididae. It was described by Bengt Å. Bengtsson in 1997. It is found in Spain (Andalusia) and Portugal.

Etymology
The species is named in honour of the collector of most of the type series, Mr. Martin Corley.

References

corleyi
Moths described in 1997